Castellina Marittima is a comune (municipality) in the province of Pisa in the Italian region Tuscany, located about  southwest of Florence and about  southeast of Pisa.

Geography
The territory of Castellina Marittima borders the following municipalities: Cecina, Chianni, Riparbella, Rosignano Marittimo, Santa Luce.

For centuries Castellina has been an important source for alabaster.

Population

References

External links

 Official website

Cities and towns in Tuscany
Alabaster